Jo Jin-Saeng (born 23 February 1965) is a South Korean Olympic middle-distance runner. He represented his country in the men's 1500 meters and the men's 4 x 400 meters relay at the 1988 Summer Olympics. His time was a 3:45.63 in the 1500, and a 3:14.71 in the 4 x 400 relay.

Jo is the youngest of six children. His father Jo Pan-geum was a farmer. He attended North Jeolla Sports High School.

References 

1965 births
Living people
South Korean male middle-distance runners
Olympic athletes of South Korea
Athletes (track and field) at the 1988 Summer Olympics